Peng Guanying (born 18 February 1986) is a Chinese actor. He graduated from the Beijing Film Academy.

Career

2011–2015: Acting debut 
In 2011, Peng made his acting debut in the drama Naked Marriage Era . He then made his commercial film debut in Time Flies Soundlessly in 2012, and received good reviews for his performance in the television series  The Sweet Burden in 2013.
Peng then starred in modern romance dramas Because Love is a Miracle  and  Because Love is Sunny produced by Hunan TV, which aired in 2013 and 2014 respectively.

2016–present: Rising popularity
In 2016, Peng gained popularity for portraying the male lead in the historical romance drama Princess of Lanling King. In 2017, Peng featured in the fantasy epic drama Tribes and Empires: Storm of Prophecy as an ambitious and greedy prince.

In 2018, Peng was cast in the biopic drama Teresa Teng as the first love of the female lead. The same year he starred in the family drama Warm Jacket, portraying a single father.

In 2019, Peng gained attention for portraying the morally ambiguous male lead in the romance suspense drama The Controllers.

Filmography

Film

Television series

Discography

Awards and nominations

References

1986 births
Living people
Beijing Film Academy alumni
Male actors from Changchun
21st-century Chinese male actors